The Theban Tomb TT127 is located in Sheikh Abd el-Qurna, part of the Theban Necropolis, on the west bank of the Nile, opposite to Luxor.

The tomb belongs to an 18th Dynasty ancient Egyptian named Sememiah, who was a royal scribe and overseer of the treasuries during the reigns of Hatshepsut and Thutmosis III. It was later usurped and extended by Piay and Pairy, during the Ramesside period.

See also
 List of Theban tombs

References

Buildings and structures completed in the 13th century BC
Theban tombs